I Can't Marry Them All is a 1952 West German musical comedy film directed by Hans Wolff and starring Sonja Ziemann, Adrian Hoven and Hardy Krüger.

It was shot at the Wandsbek Studios in Hamburg and on location in the Swiss resort town of St. Moritz. The film's sets were designed by Rolf Zehetbauer.

Cast
 Sonja Ziemann as Dschidschi
 Adrian Hoven as Fredi
 Hardy Krüger as Edi
 Joachim Brennecke as Ernst Vogel
 Marina Ried as Gaby
 Eva Maria Meineke as Rita
 Karin Andersen as Lilli
 Ernst Waldow as Hoteldirektor
 Hermann Pfeiffer as Schabransky
 Helmuth Rudolph as Dumont
 Walter Janssen as Alter Herr
 Harald Mannl as Konsul
 Luitgard Im as Emmi
 Dieter Schmidkunz

References

Bibliography 
 Hans-Michael Bock and Tim Bergfelder. The Concise Cinegraph: An Encyclopedia of German Cinema. Berghahn Books, 2009.

External links 
 

1952 films
1952 musical comedy films
German musical comedy films
West German films
1950s German-language films
Films directed by Hans Wolff
Films shot at Wandsbek Studios
German black-and-white films
1950s German films